Camila Gonzalez (born July 7, 1997) is a Colombian-Canadian model, television host and beauty pageant titleholder who was crowned Miss International Canada 2018 and represented Canada at Miss International 2018. in Tokyo.

Personal life 

Gonzalez was born in Cali, Colombia and raised in Brampton, Ontario. She studied journalism at Ryerson University and has worked in radio and television broadcasting in Canada.

Television 

Gonzalez is a television host and producer for TLN Media Group. She is the Halftime Show host for TLN’s Canadian broadcast of Serie A Italian League Soccer. She also is a host for Univision Canada.

Gonzalez has interviewed personalities such as Justin Trudeau, and covered Premio Lo Nuestro, Latin Grammys and the Billboard Latin Music Awards.

She was a part of the TLN team covering the multilingual broadcast of the 2018 Winter Olympics.

She has travelled across Italy with the Serie A Halftime Show to produce segments about top Serie A teams, players and the country’s calcio culture. The 2018-2019 season highlighted A.C. Milan, Juventus, S.S.C. Napoli, Inter Milan and A.S. Roma.

The first episodes of the 2019-2020 Serie A Halftime Show featured interviews with S.S.C. Napoli’s Aurelio De Laurentiis and Carlo Ancelotti

Gonzalez won a Google News Initiative Award in Multimedia Journalism for her participation in the project “Hong Kong 360.” The multimedia project was produced by undergrad and grad students from Ryerson University’s journalism program from May to June 2018 in Hong Kong.

Pageantry 

Gonzalez finished 3rd runner-up at Miss Universe Canada 2016 and earned the right to represent Canada at Reinado Internacional del Cafe 2017. The winner was Siera Bearchell from Moose Jaw, Saskatchewan who placed Top 9 at Miss Universe 2016.

Gonzalez placed 1st runner-up at Miss Universe Canada 2018 and was crowned Miss International Canada 2018. The winner was Marta Stepien, who also preceded Gonzalez as Miss International Canada 2017.

Gonzalez represented Canada at Miss International 2018 on November 9, 2018 in Tokyo, Japan.

References

External links 
 Official Instagram

1997 births
Living people
Miss International 2018 delegates
Toronto Metropolitan University alumni
People from Cali
Female models from Ontario
Canadian television hosts
Canadian women television hosts
Canadian people of Colombian descent